SS Benjamin Hawkins was a Liberty ship built in the United States during World War II. She was named after Benjamin Hawkins, an American planter, statesman, and US Indian agent. He was a delegate to the Continental Congress and a United States senator from North Carolina. Appointed by George Washington as General Superintendent for Indian Affairs (1796–1818), he had responsibility for the Native American tribes south of the Ohio River, and was principal Indian agent to the Creek Indians.

Construction
Benjamin Hawkins was laid down on 30 July 1942, under a Maritime Commission (MARCOM) contract, MCE hull 913, by the Bethlehem-Fairfield Shipyard, Baltimore, Maryland; she was sponsored by Mrs. Lelia W. Wright, the wife of a yard employee, and was launched on 7 September 1942.

History
She was allocated to States Marine Corporation, on 22 September 1942. On 13 May 1948, she was laid up in the Hudson River Reserve Fleet, Jones Point, New York. She was withdrawn from the fleet on 7 July 1949, to be loaded with grain, returning 18 July 1949, full. On 19 January 1950, she was withdrawn to unload grain, returning empty on 31 January 1950. On 2 August 1950, she was withdrawn from the fleet to be loaded with grain, returning full on 10 August 1950. On 26 January 1951, she was withdrawn to be unloaded, she returned empty on 6 February 1951. She was laid up in the National Defense Reserve Fleet, Wilmington, North Carolina, 15 July 1952. On 4 October 1957, she was laid up in the James River Reserve Fleet, Lee Hall, Virginia. On 4 December 1972, she was sold for scrapping to N. V. Intershitra, for $103,450. She was removed from the fleet on 31 January 1973.

References

Bibliography

 
 
 
 

 

Liberty ships
Ships built in Baltimore
1942 ships
Hudson River Reserve Fleet
Hudson River Reserve Fleet Grain Program
Wilmington Reserve Fleet
James River Reserve Fleet